The Jack Ma Foundation (JMF) has been since 2014 the philanthropic arm of the Chinese activities of Jack Ma.

History
In September 2018, Ma announced that he would retire from the company he founded and the source of his wealth, internet merchandiser Alibaba, in order to pursue educational work, philanthropy, and environmental causes.

In 2019 the JMF started the Netpreneur Initiative that grants ten prizes of one million dollars each to ten African entrepreneurs per year and launched a fund with $14.6 million to develop education in Tibet.

In 2020, JMF was announced as one of the alliance partners of Prince William's Earthshot Prize to find solutions to environmental issues.

Coronavirus
In March 2020, in response to the coronavirus pandemic, the Jack Ma Foundation announced its intention to donate a total 500,000 testing kits and 1 million masks to the United States, stating "we join hands with Americans in these difficult times". The Foundation, along with the Alibaba Group, has also donated similar materials to Iran, Italy, Spain, Belgium, Japan and South Korea. He also announced a donation of 1.1 million tests, 6 million masks, and 60,000 protective suits to all African countries to combat the pandemic. For instance in Nigeria a senior health official, Abdulaziz Abdullahi, said that the country had received 100,000 face masks, 1,000 protective gowns and 20,000 test kits.

On 18 March 2020, the JMF published Handbook of COVID-19 Prevention and Treatment, a detailed 68-page book edited by Tingbo Liang that documents the clinical experience obtained at the First Affiliated Hospital of the Zhejiang University School of Medicine in the fight against the coronavirus pandemic.

The BBC called Ma's efforts to send medical equipment to over 150 countries "unrivaled". While Jack Dorsey of Twitter has pledged more money, Ma's shipments of vital supplies might sometimes be more welcome than cash. Beneficiaries include the U.S., Russia, Israel, and Iran; as of April 2020, Ma has declined to donate to any countries such as Honduras and Haiti that have diplomatic ties with Taiwan. Chinese ambassadors are often present at ceremonial handovers of Ma's supplies to beneficiary countries. Ma's shipments appear to have gone smoothly, with the exceptions of Cuba and Eritrea; in contrast, shipments to several countries from the Chinese government have been criticized for being faulty or being too low-quality to use. Following U.S. State Department gratitude over Taiwan's shipment of 2 million masks, the Chinese Foreign Ministry tweeted in April 2020, "Wonder if @StateDept has any comment on Jack Ma's donation of 1 million masks and 500k testing kits as well as Chinese companies' and provinces' assistance?" Chinese media at one point in April 2020 mentioned Ma almost as often as it mentioned Chinese Communist Party leader, Xi Jinping. While Ma is a member of the Chinese Communist Party, some analysts nevertheless believe that the Chinese government may view Ma's personal foreign and domestic popularity as a mixed blessing.

External links 

 Homepage

References

Jack Ma
Biomedical research foundations
Organizations established in 2018
2018 establishments in China
Organizations associated with the COVID-19 pandemic